A Fool's Awakening is a 1924 American silent drama film directed by Harold M. Shaw and starring Mary Alden, Lionel Belmore, and Enid Bennett.

Plot
As described in a film magazine review, John Briggs, who was seen service during World War I during the Bolshevik Revolution, returns to England. Discouraged by his failure to be a success in literature, he uses as source material for his stories the tales in a diary he found on a dead Russian soldier. Published using the name Alexis Triona, it becomes a hit. He weds Olivia Gale, and subsequently reveals his deception to her. Repulsed by Olivia after he meets her after driving his automobile, he deliberately swings the vehicle over a cliff. She goes to his aid. He recovers and they are reconciled.

Cast

References

Bibliography
 Munden, Kenneth White. The American Film Institute Catalog of Motion Pictures Produced in the United States, Part 1. University of California Press, 1997.

External links

1924 films
1924 drama films
Silent American drama films
Films directed by Harold M. Shaw
American silent feature films
1920s English-language films
American black-and-white films
Metro Pictures films
Films set in England
Films set in Russia
Films based on British novels
1920s American films